Chelfham is a small borough in North Devon, England. It is situated between Bratton Fleming and Barnstaple (the largest town in North Devon). The village has a special needs school (now closed), and also a disused railway viaduct and station.

References

External links

Villages in Devon